The Women's Omnium was the only elite women's events at the 2008 European Track Championships held in Pruszków, Poland and took place at 3 September. The omnium consisted of four events: elimination race, scratch race, 3000m individual pursuit and a points race. Seventeen cyclists participated in the women's omnium.

Overall results

Results

References

2008 European Track Championships